Jameh Karan (also Romanized as Jāmeh Kārān, Jom‘eh Kārān, and Chūmeh Kārān) is a village in Tarand Rural District, Jalilabad District, Pishva County, Tehran Province, Iran. At the 2006 census, its population was 102, in 25 families.

References 

Populated places in Pishva County